Gordon Stevenson was an artist, actor, musician and filmmaker who died of AIDS in 1982, one of the East Village art community’s first casualties of the AIDS epidemic.

Personal life
Born in Dublin, Georgia, he attended Eckerd College in St. Petersburg, Florida, where he met Arto Lindsay in the 1970s. Following a move to New York City, he married Mirielle Cervenka, (also known as Spike) who was older sister of Exene Cervenka of the band X). A well-known figure of the East Village underground, Stevenson was close to such Lower East Side figures as Fun Gallery director Patti Astor. Stevenson's brother, Davey Stevenson, bass player in the early 1980s Athens, Georgia band Limbo District, also died of AIDS in the early 1990s. Both Gordon and Davey are buried in Dublin, Georgia.

Music
Stevenson became the bass player for Lydia Lunch's band Pre Teenage Jesus and the Jerks and Teenage Jesus and the Jerks between November 1977 to June 1978, one of several No Wave bands featured on the album No New York. Stevenson, with Teenage Jesus and the Jerks, also released music on Charles Ball's Lust/Unlust label, and toured England.

Film
As an actor, he appeared in Michael McClard's 1979 no wave cinema film Alien Portrait, in Eric Mitchell's 1978 film Kidnapped, and again in Mitchell's 1979 film Red Italy. Most notably, Stevenson directed his own no wave film Ecstatic Stigmatic: the film with a disease in 1980. Starring Mirielle Cervenka as Little Rose, Ecstatic Stigmatic also featured performances by Arto Lindsay, Johnny O’Kane, Brenda Bergman and Anita Paltrinieri. The film premiered at the Mudd Club on September 4, 1980.

AIDS death
Stevenson died in the early 1980s, an early casualty to the AIDS epidemic, not long after his wife, Mirielle, was killed in an auto accident while visiting her sister in Los Angeles and promoting Ecstatic Stigmatic.
Cookie Mueller wrote about Stevenson, and quotes a personal letter from him written during his illness, in her book Walking Through Clear Water in a Pool Painted Black, published by Semiotext(e) after her death (also from AIDS, in 1989).

Footnotes

References
 Carlo McCormick, The Downtown Book: The New York Art Scene, 1974–1984, Princeton University Press, 2006.
 Alan Moore and Marc Miller, eds. ABC No Rio Dinero: The Story of a Lower East Side Art Gallery New York: ABC No Rio with Collaborative Projects, 1985.
 Masters, Marc. No Wave. London: Black Dog Publishing, 2007. 
 Pearlman, Alison, Unpackaging Art of the 1980s. Chicago: University Of Chicago Press, 2003.
 Reynolds, Simon. "Contort Yourself: No Wave New York." In Rip It Up and Start Again: Post-punk 1978–84. London: Faber and Faber, Ltd., 2005.
 Taylor, Marvin J. (ed.). The Downtown Book: The New York Art Scene, 1974–1984, foreword by Lynn Gumpert. Princeton: Princeton University Press, 2006. 

Year of birth missing
Punk films
1982 deaths
American experimental filmmakers
No wave
American film directors
AIDS-related deaths in Georgia (U.S. state)
People from Dublin, Georgia
American rock bass guitarists
Teenage Jesus and the Jerks members